Malamor is a 2003 Colombian drama film directed by Jorge Echeverry. It was entered into the 25th Moscow International Film Festival and the 2004 Latin American Film Festival.

Cast
 Gustavo Angarita
 Fabio Rubiano
 John Álex Toro
 Cristina Umaña
 Marcela Valencia

References

External links
 

2003 films
2003 drama films
2000s Spanish-language films
Colombian drama films